Bankers Securities Corporation (B.S.C.) was a Philadelphia, Pennsylvania-based investment company formed in 1927, by Albert M. Greenfield for general investment banking and trading in securities.  It eventually became the parent company for virtually all of Greenfield's financial interests. B.S.C. bought control of Lit Brothers department store, then subsequently sold it to City Stores Company.  On December 1, 1931, City Stores Company could no longer meet its financial obligation to B.S.C. and Greenfield took control of City Stores.  Greenfield was now a retail magnate.  B.S.C bought other stores outside the City Stores umbrella including: N. Snellenburg & Company; Bonwit Teller & Company; Tiffany & Co.; and Loft Candy Corporation. The Greenfield B.S.C. empire also included a number of Philadelphia based hotels including the Bellevue-Stratford, Benjamin Franklin, Sylvania, Adelphia, Essex, John Bartram and the Ritz-Carlton in Philadelphia and Atlantic City, New Jersey. Greenfield resigned as chairman of B.S.C. in March 1959, and was succeeded by Gustave G. Amsterdam.

References

External links
 The Albert M. Greenfield Papers, including correspondence, news clippings and office files, are available for research use at the Historical Society of Pennsylvania.

Financial services companies established in 1927
Investment companies of the United States